The 1961 Wichita Shockers football team was an American football team that represented the University of Wichita (now known as Wichita State University) as a member of the Missouri Valley Conference (MVC) during the 1961 NCAA University Division football season. In its second season under head coach Hank Foldberg, the team compiled an 8–3 record (3–0 against MVC opponents), won the MVC championship, and outscored opponents by a total of 230 to 189. Wichita finished  the season with a 17–9 loss to Villanova in the Sun Bowl. The team played its home games at Veterans Field, now known as Cessna Stadium. Pro Football Hall of Fame coach Bill Parcells was a sophomore linebacker on the team.

Schedule

References

Wichita
Wichita State Shockers football seasons
Missouri Valley Conference football champion seasons
Wichita Shockers football